John Harry McNeaney (30 May 1897 – 1 March 1919) was a Canadian First World War flying ace, flying with both the Royal Flying Corps and the Royal Air Force. He was credited with five aerial victories. John McNeaney was the only Canadian Sopwith Dolphin Ace.

Personal life
John McNeaney was born on 30 May 1897, the son of John and Mary Elizabeth McNeaney.  He married Bertha Emma McNeaney (née Jones), when he was 17.  His christened middle name was Henry, but he signed his marriage certificate Harry, and always used that name.  They may have lived at 178, West Second St., Upper Hamilton, Ontario, Canada.  He also gave an address of 237 Charlton Avenue West. McNeaney had a successful career as a competent commercial artist before he joined the Royal Flying Corps on 5 May 1917.

History
Commissioned in August 1917, he flew with No. 79 Squadron RAF, flying the Sopwith Dolphin and successfully claimed four German Fokker D.VIIs and a Halberstadt C destroyed. He was awarded the Distinguished Flying Cross after he and two others engaged about ten Fokker D.VIIs near Paschendale in Belgium on 28 September 1918.  Four Fokkers were claimed destroyed, two accounted for by McNeaney. McNeaney was wounded in June 1918 while on a trench strafing sortie.

After cessation of hostilities, John was posted to Germany as part of the forces of occupation. He contracted influenza and was brought back to England. He died on 1 March 1919 and was buried at Fulham Old Cemetery in West London, just south of Hammersmith Bridge.  His grave has been marked by the Commonwealth War Graves Commission, which has erected a headstone.

Honors and awards
Distinguished Flying Cross (DFC)

Lieut. (A./Capt.) John Harry McNeaney. (FRANCE)

A gallant and courageous airman who has accounted for five enemy aeroplanes, displaying at all times marked skill and devotion to duty. On 28 September, in company with two other machines, he engaged about ten Fokkers; four of these were destroyed, two by Lieut. McNeaney.

Sources of information

References
Dolphin and Snipe Aces of World War 1. Norman Franks. Osprey Publishing, 2002. ,

External links
John McNeaney at The Aerodrome Forum
Harry McNeaney at findagrave

Canadian World War I flying aces
1897 births
1919 deaths
Deaths from Spanish flu